Daniel Eugene Long Jr. is a retired United States Army major general and former Adjutant General of Virginia.

Military career

Dates of rank

References

Living people
Year of birth missing (living people)
United States Army generals
National Guard (United States) generals
Virginia National Guard personnel